Farida Waller or Nutpimon Natthayalak, nicknamed Rida (born October 24, 1993) is a Thai-Austrian actress and model who was crowned Miss Universe Thailand 2012 and represented Thailand at the Miss Universe 2012 pageant.

Early life and education
Waller was born and raised in Krabi to an Austrian father, Michael Waller, and a Thai mother, Suphun Wannapat. She graduated from Bangkok University in 2016.

Pageantry
Waller was crowned as Miss Universe Thailand 2012 by outgoing titleholder Chanyasorn Sakornchan at the Siam Pavalai Royal Grand Theatre, Siam Paragon on Saturday 2 June 2012. Miss Universe Thailand 2012 was the 13th edition of the Miss Universe Thailand pageant.

She represented Thailand in Miss Universe 2012 held in Las Vegas, Nevada, but did not place in the Top 16.

References

External links
Official site of Miss Universe Thailand

Living people
Farida Waller
Miss Universe 2012 contestants
Farida Waller
Farida Waller
Farida Waller
Farida Waller
Farida Waller
1993 births